The Quranic Arabic Corpus is an annotated linguistic resource consisting of 77,430 words of Quranic Arabic. The project aims to provide morphological and syntactic annotations for researchers wanting to study the language of the Quran.

Functions
The grammatical analysis helps readers further in uncovering the detailed intended meanings of each verse and sentence. Each word of the Quran is tagged with its part-of-speech as well as multiple morphological features. Unlike other annotated Arabic corpora, the grammar framework adopted by the Quranic Corpus is the traditional Arabic grammar of i'rab. The research project is led by Kais Dukes at the University of Leeds, and is part of the Arabic language computing research group within the School of Computing, supervised by Eric Atwell.

The annotated corpus includes:

 A manually verified part-of-speech tagged Quranic Arabic corpus. 
 An annotated treebank of Quranic Arabic. 
 A novel visualization of traditional Arabic grammar through dependency graphs. 
 Morphological search for the Quran. 
 A machine-readable morphological lexicon of Quranic words into English. 
 A part-of-speech concordance for Quranic Arabic organized by lemma.
 An online message board for community volunteer annotation.

Corpus annotation assigns a part-of-speech tag and morphological features to each word. For example, annotation involves deciding whether a word is a noun or a verb, and if it is inflected for masculine or feminine. The first stage of the project involved automatic part-of-speech tagging by applying Arabic language computing technology to the text. The annotation for each of the 77,430 words in the Quran was then reviewed in stages by two annotators, and improvements are still ongoing to further improve accuracy.

Linguistic research for the Quran that uses the annotated corpus includes training Hidden Markov model part-of-speech taggers for Arabic, automatic categorization of Quranic chapters, and prosodic analysis of the text.

In addition, the project provides a word-by-word Quranic translation based on accepted English sources, instead of producing a new translation of the Qur'an.

See also 
 Corpus linguistics
 Quran
 Classical Arabic
 Treebank

References

External links 
Quranic Arabic Corpus

Corpora
Arabic language
Works about the Quran
Applied linguistics
Linguistic research
Online Scripture Search Engine